Edward John Sorensen (born 20 January 1953) is an Australian politician. He was a Liberal National Party member of the Legislative Assembly of Queensland from 2009 to 2020.

Sorensen attended public schools in Hervey Bay, and was elected to Hervey Bay City Council in 1994. In 2000 he became mayor, serving in that position until 2008, when he was selected as the Liberal National Party candidate for Hervey Bay for the 2009 state election. He was successful, achieving a large swing to defeat sitting Labor member and Bligh government Minister Andrew McNamara.

Sorensen announced in May 2020 that he would retire from state politics at the 2020 Queensland state election in October.

References

1953 births
Living people
Liberal National Party of Queensland politicians
Members of the Queensland Legislative Assembly
Queensland local councillors
Mayors of places in Queensland
Australian pastoralists
21st-century Australian politicians